Bimla Chaudhary is a member of the Haryana Legislative Assembly from the Bharatiya Janata Party representing the Pataudi Vidhan Sabha Constituency in Haryana.

References

Members of the Haryana Legislative Assembly
Living people
Year of birth missing (living people)
Place of birth missing (living people)
Bharatiya Janata Party politicians from Haryana